Abdullah Yousef (Arabic:عبد الله يوسف) (born 19 April 1996) is an Emirati footballer. He currently plays for Al Bataeh as a goalkeeper .

References

External links
 

Emirati footballers
1996 births
Living people
Sharjah FC players
Khor Fakkan Sports Club players
Al Bataeh Club players
UAE Pro League players
Association football goalkeepers